Events in the year 2018 in Bahrain.

Incumbents
 Monarch: Hamad ibn Isa Al Khalifa
 Prime Minister: Khalifa bin Salman Al Khalifa

Events

7 – 8 April – 2018 Bahrain FIA Formula 2 round.
8 April – 2018 Bahrain Grand Prix.

Deaths

10 June – Hala bint D'aij Al Khalifa, royal.

References

 
2010s in Bahrain 
Years of the 21st century in Bahrain 
Bahrain 
Bahrain